
Taborga Lake is a lake in the Santa Cruz Department, Bolivia. At an elevation of 200 m, its surface area is 25.5 km².

Lakes of Santa Cruz Department (Bolivia)